A sugarcane harvester is a large piece of agricultural machinery used to harvest and partially process sugarcane.

The machine, originally developed in the 1920s, remains similar in function and design to the combine harvester. Essentially a storage vessel on a truck with a mechanical extension, the machine cuts the stalks at the base, strips the leaves off, and then cuts the cane into segments. These are then deposited into either the on-board container, or a separate vehicle traveling alongside. Waste material is then ejected back onto the field, where it acts as fertilizer.

See also

 Zafra (agriculture) - the sugarcane harvesting season

References

External links

Combine harvesters